Acacia dorsenna is a shrub belonging to the genus Acacia and the subgenus Phyllodineae that is endemic to Western Australia.

The smooth dull green phyllodes have an elliptic to obovate shape. It blooms from August to September producing yellow flowers. The inflorescences are found in groups of seven to ten. The spherical flower-heads contain 15 to 21 bright golden yellow flowers.

It is a member of the Acacia prainii and resembles Acacia camptoclada and some forms of Acacia merrallii.

It is native to a small area in the Goldfields-Esperance region of Western Australia in a small area in the Dundas where it is found on low rocky hills growing in rocky sandy-loam-clay soils.

See also
List of Acacia species

References

dorsenna
Acacias of Western Australia
Taxa named by Bruce Maslin
Plants described in 1995